Leone was the lead ship of her class of three destroyers built for the  (Royal Italian Navy) in the early 1920s.

Design and description
The ships were designed as scout cruisers (esploratori), essentially enlarged versions of contemporary destroyers. They were initially ordered in 1917, but postponed due to steel shortages, and re-ordered in 1920. Their complement was 10 officers and 194 enlisted men.

The Leones were powered by two Parsons geared steam turbines, each driving one propeller shaft using steam supplied by four Yarrow boilers.

Their main battery consisted of eight  guns in four twin-gun turrets, one each fore and aft of the superstructure and the remaining turrets positioned between the funnels and the torpedo tube mounts amidships. Anti-aircraft (AA) defense for the Leone-class ships was provided by a pair of  AA guns in single mounts amidships. They were equipped with six  torpedo tubes in two triple mounts. The Leones could also carry 60 mines.

Citations

Bibliography

External links
 Leone Marina Militare website

Leone-class destroyers
Ships built in Genoa
Ships built by Gio. Ansaldo & C.
1923 ships
World War II destroyers of Italy
Maritime incidents in April 1941